Konstancja may refer to:

Konstancja Benisławska (1747–1806), Polish poet and writer of religious hymns
Konstancja Czartoryska (1700–1759) (1696–1759), Polish szlachta, known as the mother of king Stanisław August Poniatowski
Konstancja Gładkowska (1810–1889), Polish soprano
Konstancja Kochaniec (born 1976), Polish classical and film music composer
Anna Katarzyna Konstancja (1619–1651), Polish princess, daughter of King Sigismund III Vasa and his second wife Constance of Austria
Konstancja Lubomirska (1618–1646), Polish noble lady
Konstancja Małgorzata Lubomirska (1761–1840), Polish noblewoman artist
Konstancja Poniatowska (1759–1830), Polish noblewoman, niece of king Stanisław August Poniatowski
Konstancja Potocka (1781–1852), Polish noblewoman, translator and illustrator
Elżbieta Konstancja Potulicka (1859–1947), Polish noblewoman
Konstancja Sanguszko (1716–1791), Polish magnate
Gryzelda Konstancja Wiśniowiecka (1623–1672), Polish noblewoman, mother of King Michał Korybut Wiśniowiecki

See also
Wólka-Konstancja, a village in Gmina Stanisławów, Mińsk County, Masovian Voivodeship, in east-central Poland
Konstan
Kostana (disambiguation)